Sergey Govorushko (b. May 9, 1955) is a Russian scientist. Laureate of the 2012 Grigoriev Prize of the Russian Academy of Sciences. He is a Doktor nauk, Principal Researcher at the Pacific Geographical Institute of the Far Eastern Branch of the Russian Academy of Sciences, Professor at the Far Eastern Federal University.

Career 
In 1977, Govorushko graduated from the Far Eastern State University. He was a student of Prof. Boris Vtyurin.

In 1984, Govorushko defended his Candidate's Dissertation.
In 2002, he defended his doctoral dissertation.

Since 1975 he works at the Pacific Geographical Institute of the Far Eastern Branch of the Russian Academy of Sciences, now as Principal Researcher.

His work was supported by the Russian Foundation for Basic Research.

In 2014, he received the title of Professor of School of Natural Sciences at the Far Eastern Federal University.

In 2016, he was a candidate for Corresponding Member of the Russian Academy of Sciences.

He is a member of the Editorial Board for Annals of the University of Craiova. Series Geography.

Govorushko is the author more than 230 published works including 26 monographs. He is author of monograph Human-Insect Interactions (CRC Press, 2017).

References

External links
 http://ruspekh.ru/people/item/govorushko-sergej-mikhajlovich

1955 births
Living people
Russian geographers
Academic staff of the Far Eastern Federal University
Far Eastern Federal University alumni